Cocolamus is a small village in Juniata County, Pennsylvania, United States, situated along the bank of the Cocolamus Creek.

References

Unincorporated communities in Juniata County, Pennsylvania
Unincorporated communities in Pennsylvania